Beston is a surname. Notable people with the surname include:

Henry Beston (1888–1968), American writer and naturalist
John Beston (died 1428), English writer

See also
Besson (surname)